Roy Cove is a settlement on West Falkland, in the Falkland Islands, in the north west. It faces southwards, onto King George Bay.

References

Populated places on West Falkland